Milford Ice Pavilion is a 1,000-seat skating rink in Milford, Connecticut. It is home to the Milford Indians co-op high school team, and Sacred Heart University Pioneers men's ice hockey team until 2016.  The building opened in 1975 and was renovated in 1985.  It also serves several local hockey high school and club level teams.  It has been the home of the Sacred Heart hockey program since its inception in 1993.

Its sister facility was the Northford Ice Pavilion in North Branford, Connecticut.  However, ownership of the Milford Ice recently changed and the two facilities no longer are related (except for the snack bars).

References

External links 
 

Sports venues completed in 1975
Sacred Heart Pioneers ice hockey
College ice hockey venues in the United States
Indoor ice hockey venues in the United States
Buildings and structures in Milford, Connecticut
Sports venues in New Haven County, Connecticut
1975 establishments in Connecticut